Ole Poulsen (born 16 December 1941) is a retired Danish sailor. Competing in the dragon class he won gold medals at the 1964 Olympics and 1965 World Championships, both times with Ole Berntsen.
His mother Ulla Barding-Poulsen and grandmother Yutta Barding were Olympic fencers.

References

External links
 
 
 

1941 births
Living people
Danish male sailors (sport)
Olympic sailors of Denmark
Sailors at the 1964 Summer Olympics – Dragon
Olympic gold medalists for Denmark
Olympic medalists in sailing
Hellerup Sejlklub sailors
Medalists at the 1964 Summer Olympics